Giddy may refer to:

 Giddy (album), 2009 compilation album by Irish band Pugwash
 Giddy (surname), includes a list of people with the name
 "Giddy", a 1977 song written by Paul McCartney on Roger Daltrey's album One of the Boys
 Great dodecicosahedron
 Giddy Goat, fictional animated goat

See also
 
 
 The Giddy Game Show
 Gid (disambiguation)